Heikki Aleksi "Ale" Riipinen (28 May 1883 – 13 February 1957) was a Finnish gymnast who won bronze in the 1908 Summer Olympics.

Gymnastics 

He won the Finnish national championship in team gymnastics as a member of Ylioppilasvoimistelijat in 1909.

Career 

He completed his matriculation exam at the Jyväskylä Classical Lyceum in 1903 and graduated as a physical education teacher in 1908.

He worked as a school teacher in Lapua in 1908–1927, becoming also a rector. Then he worked as a lecturer in Jyväskylä in 1927–1948. Finally he returned to Lapua to teach until 1951.

He also wrote on physical education and other subjects in Suomen Urheilulehti and other papers.

He was the chairman of the state taxation board in Lapua in 1923–1927.

Military 

He served in the White Guard as a platoon leader and a company commander during the Finnish Civil War. He was a garrison commandant in the Finnish Defence Forces 
and a chief of office of a White Guard district during the Second World War. He reached the rank of lieutenant.

Politics 

He played a small part in initiating the namesake action of the Lapua Movement, although it is unknown, if he actually participated it.

Accolades 

He received the following honorary awards:
 Cross of Liberty, 4th Class
 The cross of merit of the Civil Guards
 Medals of the Finnish Civil War:
 The commemorative medal of the capture of Tampere
 The Vilppula cross
 Decorations of the heimosodat:
 The commemorative medal of Carelia
He is also an honorary member of several clubs and associations.

Family 

His parents were farmer Mikko Riipinen and Iida Manninen.

He married Hilja Miklin-Metsäpolku in 1911. They had two children:
 Heljä Kaarina, born 1912, died 1926
 Anna Pirkko Sätene, born 1920, died 1964

He died from a heart attack in Espoo while visiting his daughter.

References

1883 births
1957 deaths
People from Laukaa
People from Vaasa Province (Grand Duchy of Finland)
Finnish male artistic gymnasts
Gymnasts at the 1908 Summer Olympics
Olympic gymnasts of Finland
Olympic bronze medalists for Finland
Olympic medalists in gymnastics
Medalists at the 1908 Summer Olympics
Sportspeople from Central Finland
20th-century Finnish people